Baudin Conservation Park is a protected area located on the north coast of Dudley Peninsula on Kangaroo Island in South Australia about  south east of Penneshaw.  It was proclaimed under the National Parks and Wildlife Act 1972 in 2002.  The conservation park is classified as an IUCN Category III protected area.

References

External links
Entry for Baudin Conservation Park on protected planet

Conservation parks of South Australia
Protected areas established in 2002
2002 establishments in Australia
Protected areas of Kangaroo Island
Dudley Peninsula